The Canadian Triple Crown (branded as the OLG Canadian Triple Crown for sponsorship reasons) is a series of three Thoroughbred horse races run annually in Canada which is open to three-year-old horses foaled in Canada. Established in 1959, the series is unique in that it shares the same distances as its American counterpart but is contested on three different track surfaces. 

The first leg, the King's Plate in August, is contested at 1¼ miles on Tapeta at Woodbine Racetrack in Toronto, Ontario, whereas the Prince of Wales Stakes in September is a 1³/16 mile event run on dirt at Fort Erie Race Track in Fort Erie, Ontario. The final leg is the 1½ mile Breeders' Stakes in October, which is run on turf over one full lap of the E. P. Taylor Turf Course at Woodbine.

The Canadian Triple Crown shares another characteristic with its American counterpart – all of the races in both series are open to geldings. This differs from the situation in Europe, where many important flat races, notably the British and all but one of the French classics, bar geldings.

Since 2014, all of the races in the Canadian Triple Crown have been televised by TSN.

Winners of the Triple Crown
Twelve horses are officially recognized as winning the Canadian Triple Crown:

Champions (before 1959):

Champions (since 1959):

Individual race winners

Notes
  The Canadian Triple Crown was officially established in 1959
 ♥ indicates filly

Notes
In 2011, Luis Contreras became the first jockey to sweep the Triple Crown races with different horses. He won the then Queen's Plate on Inglorious and the next two races on Pender Harbour.

In 2020, trainer Josie Carroll won all three legs of the Canadian Triple Crown with Mighty Heart winning the then Queen's Plate and Prince of Wales Stakes and Belichick winning the Breeders' Stakes.

See also
 Triple Crown of Thoroughbred Racing
 Triple Crown of Thoroughbred Racing (United States)

References

External links
Woodbine Racetrack official website
Fort Erie Race Track official website

Recurring events established in 1959
Horse races in Canada
Triple Crown of Thoroughbred Racing